Chraplewo may refer to the following places:
Chraplewo, Nowy Tomyśl County in Greater Poland Voivodeship (west-central Poland)
Chraplewo, Szamotuły County in Greater Poland Voivodeship (west-central Poland)
Chraplewo, Kuyavian-Pomeranian Voivodeship (north-central Poland)